Athletics at the 2020 Summer Paralympics were held in the National Stadium in Tokyo. There was 167 medal events: 93 for men, 73 for women and one mixed event. It was the largest contest of the Games programme regarding athlete numbers and medal events to be scheduled.

The 2020 Summer Olympic and Paralympic Games were postponed to 2021 due to the COVID-19 pandemic. They kept the 2020 name and were instead held from 24 August to 5 September 2021.

Classification and events

Participating athletes are given a classification depending on their disabilities (T denotes track events, F denotes field events). They are categorised into seven different classifications:
 T/F11-13: Blind (11) and visually impaired (12-13) athletes; track athletes would often run with a guide.
 T/F20: Athletes who have an intellectual impairment.
 T/F 31-38: Athletes who have cerebral palsy or other coordination impairments. 31-34 for wheelchair events and 35-38 for running events.
 F40-41: Les Autres - typically for athletes who have dwarfism.
 T/F 42-47: Athletes who are amputees. In field events, some athletes would compete in seated events.
 T/F 51-58: Athletes who have a spinal cord injury or disability. In field events, most athletes would compete in seated events.
 T/F 61-64: Athletes who have a prosthesis affected by limb deficiency and leg length difference.
 RR1, RR2, RR3 Athletes with severe co-ordination impairment (hypertonia, ataxia, athetosis) competing in RaceRunning events.

Event summary table

Qualification

Participating nations
As of June 2021.

 (Host nation)

Schedule

Medal table
Two silver medals were awarded for a second-place tie in the men's high jump T47 athletics event. No bronze medal was awarded as a result.

Two bronze medals were awarded for a third-place tie in the men's 100 metres T64 athletics event.

Due to the disqualification of two participants, a bronze medal was not awarded in the women's 100 metres T11 athletics event.

Source (167 Gold, 168 Silver, 166 Bronze) :

See also
Athletics at the 2020 Summer Olympics

References

External links
Results book 

2020 Summer Paralympics events
 
2020
Paralympics
International athletics competitions hosted by Japan